Antonfrancesco Vivarelli Colonna (born 23 November 1969 in Florence) is an Italian politician.

He currently serves as Mayor of Grosseto and was President of the Province of Grosseto from 2017 until 2021.

Biography
Born in Florence, he attended the Naval Academy of Livorno. He graduated as an English and German interpreter at the High School for interpreters and translators in Pisa and started his career as a professional translator and interpreter. Later he became official of the regiment "Piemonte Cavalleria 2º" of Trieste, obtaining the rank of lieutenant.

He took his leave in 1998 and moved to Maremma, where he started to administer the estate and the agricultural business of his family in Orbetello and Grosseto. Vivarelli Colonna held important positions in trade union associations dedicated to safeguarding agriculture, food and livestock. He served as president of "Confartigianato Grosseto" from 2011 to 2016.

He ran for Mayor of Grosseto as an independent at the 2016 Italian local elections, supported by a centre-right coalition formed by Lega Nord, Forza Italia, Brothers of Italy and the civic list "Maremma Migliore". He was elected Mayor of Grosseto on 19 June 2016 and took office on 23 June.

He was elected President of the Province of Grosseto on 8 January 2017.

See also
2016 Italian local elections
List of mayors of Grosseto

References

External links
 
 

1969 births
Living people
Mayors of Grosseto
Presidents of the Province of Grosseto